Hellinsia nigrosparsus is a moth of the family Pterophoridae. It is found in Peru.

The wingspan is 21 mm. The forewings are snow white with black markings. The hindwings are unmarked.

References

Moths described in 1877
nigrosparsus
Moths of South America